Elachista maculata is a moth of the family Elachistidae that is found in North Macedonia, Bulgaria and Turkey.

References

maculata
Moths described in 1978
Moths of Europe
Moths of Asia